Hoshigami: Ruining Blue Earth Remix, also known as simply Hoshigami Remix, is a strategy RPG video game, for the Nintendo DS and is a remake of Hoshigami: Ruining Blue Earth (originally released by Atlus USA) for the Sony PlayStation. The game was developed by Arc System Works and was released in Japan in May 2007 by ASNetworks and in North America in June 2007 by Aksys Games. The developed programmer is Barnhouse Effect, and characters are designed by Arc System Works.

Story
A war between the Kingdoms of Valaim and Nightweld has begun on the continent of Mardias. Fazz,  the leader of a band of mercenaries (and the main character) is hired to protect one of the Ruins of Ixia from the Valamian army. Meanwhile, an evil being rises from the shadows threatens to destroy Mardias.

Characters

Fazz: A naive young man. He is a mercenary alongside Leimrey and is the main character of the story.
Leimrey: A mercenary who uses a spear. He is a loner, but has been taken by Fazz as an older brother figure. Leimrey sees little reason for his fellow humans to exist.
Tinn: Fazz's childhood friend and secret admirer. She was a spoiled child, and now expects to get her way.
Elena: A mysterious woman Fazz meets on his journey.
Reuperl: The leader of Nightweld's Royal Guards. He hires Fazz and Leimrey to fight Valaim.
Alveen: A knight of the Valaimian Empire who fights to restore his family's name.
Gomes: A former mercenary who managed to cut out Reuperl's eye. Now he's a merchant who lives with the Tuchi Tribe.
Blackthorn: The commander of the Imperial Army that attacked Fazz's hometown. Emperor Fernandez knows nothing about Blackthorn's identity nor his ambitions. Even when he is defeated he is seemingly uninjured.
Silphatos: A priest that has his own motives for joining Fazz. He knows a lot more about the history of Mardias than he lets on.
Villa: The Priest of Earth serves as the personal adviser of Emperor Fernandez. His name matches one of the ancient Hoshigami.
Fernandez: While he appears to be the absolute dictator of Valaim, most of his decisions are influenced by the Priest of Earth.
Jacqueline: The leader of a bandit clan that resides in Gerauld. The bandits look up to her as a big sister, much to her chagrin, and she punishes them when they show their weakness to the enemy.

Features
This rerelease of Hoshigami featured several additions to make it better suited to handheld gameplay, as well as to make it more accessible to new gamers, most notably with a selectable difficulty setting. Among these features were a new localization of the dialogue, new endings, and the requisite stylus control, which, combined with the dual screens, made for a slightly easier menu-surfing experience. A new character was added to this release, and the DS’ wireless features were used for an item-trading mode.

Combat

 Shoot System
This allows each character to push either an ally or enemy two squares in any direction.

 RAP System
Each time a character performs an action, the gauge will increase until it reaches 100%.  While it is possible to attack more than once per turn, doing so uses up more of a character's RAP points, delaying their next turn.  It is possible for the gauge to exceed 100%, and this will delay the character's next turn.

 Session System
The "host character" (that performs Shoot) can deploy several party members to perform one devastating attack. In order to do this, the host must be placed next to an enemy and produce a Shoot attack into another playable character.  Doing this will make the enemy shoot again in the direction that the second character is facing, increasing the damage done.  If there is a third character placed one square away from the second that happens to be facing in a different direction, the enemy will be "shot" from the first, through the second, and out of the third, doing even more damage.  If the player's characters are placed correctly, an enemy can be "shot" up to six times.

In order to initiate a Session, the non-host characters must be put into Session Mode at the end of their turns.

Religion and Skills
There are six main religions in Hoshigami Remix. Each religion determines a character' stat growth, weapon proficiency, and which skills he/she can learn.

There are also two secret religions, which can be unlocked by learning various skills from the other religions.

Amu
The spirit of fire that symbolizes power. A worshipper of Amu is proficient with swords and penalized when using bows and morning stars. In battle, Amu is vulnerable to Gote worshippers, and is strongest against Zenith.

A worshipper of Amu cannot directly switch religions to Gote or Kashis.

Ema
The spirit of earth that symbolizes the mind. A worshipper of Ema becomes proficient with rings and penalized when using axes. In battle, Ema is vulnerable to Sonova worshippers, and is strongest against Gote.

A worshipper of Ema cannot directly switch religions to Amu or Sonova.

Sonova
The spirit of force that symbolizes life. A worshipper of Sonova becomes proficient with axes and penalized when using knives and boomerangs. In battle, Sonova is vulnerable to Kashis worshippers, and is strongest against Ema.

A worshipper of Sonova cannot directly switch religions to Gote or Kashis.

Zeneth
The spirit of water that symbolizes luck. A worshipper of Zeneth becomes proficient with spears and penalized when using swords. In battle, Zeneth is vulnerable to Amu worshippers, and is strongest against Kashis.

A worshipper of Zeneth cannot directly switch religions to Amu or Sonova.

Gote
The spirit of lightning that symbolizes wisdom. A worshipper of Gote becomes proficient with bows and morning stars and penalized when using rings. In battle, Gote is vulnerable to Ema worshippers, and is strongest against Amu.

A worshipper of Gote cannot directly switch religions to Ema or Zeneth.

Kashis
The spirit of wind that symbolizes speed. A worshipper of Kashis becomes proficient with knives and boomerangs and penalized when using spears. In battle, Kashis is vulnerable to Zeneth worshippers, and is strongest against Sonova.

A worshipper of Kashis cannot directly switch religions to Ema or Zeneth.

Reception

The game received "mixed" reviews according to the review aggregation website Metacritic. IGN said, "It can be difficult, complicated, and relatively uninspired when it comes to the overall out-of-battle experience." GameSpot said, "Hoshigami is an overcooked hodgepodge that's too unwieldy for strategy RPG newcomers and too imbalanced for experts." In Japan, Famitsu gave it a score of two sixes, one seven, and one six for a total of 25 out of 40.

References

External links
 

2007 video games
505 Games games
Arc System Works games
Nintendo DS games
Nintendo DS-only games
Tactical role-playing video games
Video game remakes
Video games developed in Japan
Video games scored by Saori Kobayashi
Barnhouse Effect games
Single-player video games